Luka Chalwell (born 11 April 2004) is a British Virgin Islands footballer who plays as a midfielder for English club Christchurch and the British Virgin Islands national team.

Career
A youth academy player of Poole Town, Chalwell is the first British Virgin Islander to play in FA Youth Cup.

After representing his nation in youth football, Chalwell received maiden call-up to senior team in March 2021. He made his senior debut on 27 March 2021 in a 3–0 loss against Guatemala.

Career statistics

International

References

2004 births
Living people
Association football midfielders
British Virgin Islands footballers
British Virgin Islands international footballers
British Virgin Islands youth international footballers
Poole Town F.C. players
British Virgin Islands under-20 international footballers